Gordon Stuart (1924–2015) was a Canadian-born Welsh portrait artist.

Gordon Stuart may also refer to:
Gordon Stuart, pen name of Canadian author H. Bedford Jones
Gordon Stuart, pen name of American author Harry Lincoln Sayler

See also
Gordon Stewart (disambiguation)
Stuart Gordon (disambiguation)